Borja Rafael del Rosario Ramos (born 14 January 1985 in Las Palmas, Canary Islands) is a Spanish footballer who plays as an attacking midfielder.

External links

1985 births
Living people
Footballers from Las Palmas
Spanish footballers
Association football midfielders
Segunda División players
Segunda División B players
Tercera División players
UD Las Palmas Atlético players
UD Las Palmas players
Atlético Malagueño players
Rayo Vallecano B players
RCD Mallorca B players
SD Lemona footballers
CD Mensajero players
Spain youth international footballers
UD Tijarafe players